Tomáš Labun (born 28 January 1984 in Humenné) is a Slovak football player who currently plays for MŠK Rimavská Sobota, on loan from MFK Tatran Liptovský Mikuláš. Labun is a midfielder or defender.

He previously played for FK LAFC Lučenec and Cercle Brugge in the Belgian First Division.

Labun has represented his country at youth level. He was also part of the Slovak team at the 2002 European U19 championship.

Honours

Slovakia
Slovakia U20
2003 FIFA U-20 World Cup: Participation
Slovakia U19
 2002 UEFA European Under-19 Football Championship - Third place

References

External links
 Tomáš Labun profile at Cerclemuseum.be 

1984 births
Living people
Slovak footballers
Association football midfielders
FC VSS Košice players
Cercle Brugge K.S.V. players
Slovak Super Liga players
MŠK Púchov players
ŠK Futura Humenné players
MFK Zemplín Michalovce players
MŠK Novohrad Lučenec players
FK Bodva Moldava nad Bodvou players
MFK Tatran Liptovský Mikuláš players
SCM Râmnicu Vâlcea players
Belgian Pro League players
Expatriate footballers in Belgium
Sportspeople from Humenné